Houserville is an unincorporated community and census-designated place (CDP) in Centre County, Pennsylvania, United States. It is part of the State College, Pennsylvania Metropolitan Statistical Area. The population was 1,814 at the 2010 census.

History
Two archaeological sites, known as the Houserville and Tudek sites, are located between Houserville and State College. Once used in the production of stone tools, the sites may be 10,000 years old. Both are listed on the National Register of Historic Places.

Geography
Houserville is located in southern Centre County at  (40.828129, -77.828301), in the northern part of College Township. It is bordered to the south by the community of Lemont, also in College Township.

Interstate 99 and U.S. Route 322 merge just to the west of Houserville; the most direct access to the highways is from Pennsylvania Route 26 in Lemont.

Spring Creek forms the western edge of the CDP, flowing northward towards Bald Eagle Creek, a tributary of the West Branch Susquehanna River.

Demographics

As of the census of 2010, there were 1,814 people, 734 households, and 508 families residing in the CDP. The population density was 1,677.9 people per square mile (647.9/km). There were 759 housing units at an average density of 694.4/sq mi (268.1/km). The racial makeup of the CDP was 92.9% White, 1.9% Black or African American, 1.8% Asian, 0.5% from other races, and 2.9% from two or more races. Hispanic or Latino of any race were 1.5% of the population.

There were 734 households, out of which 31.3% had children under the age of 18 living with them, 60.1% were married couples living together, 2.2% had a male householder with no wife present, 6.9% had a female householder with no husband present, and 30.8% were non-families. 23.8% of all households were made up of individuals, and 5.6% had someone living alone who was 65 years of age or older. The average household size was 2.47 and the average family size was 2.99.

In the CDP, the population was spread out, with 22.4% under the age of 18, 7.5% from 18 to 24, 30.0% from 25 to 44, 30.1% from 45 to 64, and 10.0% who were 65 years of age or older. The median age was 39 years. For every 100 females, there were 101.3 males. For every 100 females age 18 and over, there were 101.3 males.

The median income for a household in the CDP was $57,976, and the median income for a family was $72,981.  The per capita income for the CDP was $29,246. About 2.6% of families and 4.3% of the population were below the poverty line, including 7.3% of those under age 18 and none of those age 65 or over.

References

Census-designated places in Centre County, Pennsylvania
Census-designated places in Pennsylvania